Haakon Irgens (13 June 1884 – ?) was a Norwegian banker and politician.

He was born in Øyer to Jens Stub Irgens and Sofie Cahthinca Altschwager. He was elected representative to the Storting for the period 1925–1927, for the Conservative Party.

References

1884 births
Year of death missing
People from Øyer
Norwegian bankers
Conservative Party (Norway) politicians
Members of the Storting